Parectopa trichophysa is a moth of the family Gracillariidae. It is known from Peru.

References

Gracillariinae